This article summarizes the events, album releases, and album release dates in hip hop music for the year 2007.

Albums

Highest-charting singles

Highest first week sales

As of December 31, 2007.

Highest critically reviewed albums (Metacritic)

See also
Previous article: 2006 in hip hop music
Next article: 2008 in hip hop music

References

2000s in hip hop music
Hip hop
Hip hop music by year